Gorst is a census-designated place (CDP) at the head of Sinclair Inlet in Kitsap County, Washington, United States. The population was 592 at the 2010 census. Gorst, located on the shores of Puget Sound, is primarily a town consisting of stores, auto dealerships and espresso stands. A residential area, located west of the water along State Route 3, also exists.

Gorst is named for the Gorst family who settled there in the 1890s.  Famous residents of Gorst include Vern C. Gorst, "grandfather" of United Airlines, and Edward S. Curtis and Asahel Curtis, well-known photographers. The town has also been linked to the infamous Tree Octopus Hoax, which began on the internet in 1998.

External links 
 Vern Gorst, "Grandad" of United Airlines
Vern C. Gorst Photographs, A Pacific Northwest adventurer and transportation pioneer - University of Washington Digital Collection

References 

Census-designated places in Kitsap County, Washington
Census-designated places in Washington (state)